Szymon Jerzy Pawłowski (born 5 December 1978 in Sanok) is a Polish politician. He was elected to the Sejm on 25 September 2005, getting 7984 votes in 20 Warsaw district as a candidate from the League of Polish Families list.

See also
Members of Polish Sejm 2005-2007

External links
Szymon Pawłowski - parliamentary page - includes declarations of interest, voting record, and transcripts of speeches.

1978 births
Living people
People from Sanok
Members of the Polish Sejm 2005–2007
League of Polish Families politicians